Sangun-myeon (Hangeul: 상운면, Hanja: 祥雲面) is a myeon or a township in Bonghwa county of North Gyeongsang province in South Korea. The total area of Sangun-myeon is 58.52 square kilometers, and, as of 2006, the population was 2,070 people. Sangun-myeon is further divided into eight "ri", or small villages.

Hanul-ri in Sangun-myeon is also the setting of the 2008 documentary film Old Partner, the highest grossing independent film in South Korea.

Administrative divisions
Gagok-ri (가곡리)
Ungye-ri (운계리)
Munchon-ri (문촌리)
Hanul-ri (하눌리)
Toil-ri (토일리)
Gucheon-ri (구천리)
Seolmae (설매리)
Sinra-ri (신라리)

Schools
Sangun Elementary School (상운초등학교) in Gagok-ri.
Sangun Middle School (상운중학교) in Gagok-ri.

References

External links 
 Sangun-myeon Office Homepage
 Tourist Map of Bonghwa county including Sangun-myeon

Bonghwa County
Towns and townships in North Gyeongsang Province